Marutha is a place in Nilambur taluk of Malappuram district. It is also known as village of gold hills.

English & Malayalam
| other_name

Etymology
Marutha is an areal which includes place such as Mundappoty, Kettungal, School Kunnu, Chakkappadam, Kanjirathingal, Vendekumpoty, Vengapadam, Mathalappara, Maruthakkadavu, etc.  Marutha is a part of Vazhikkadavu Panchayath and is known for its gold deposits along the banks of river Maruthappuzha. Maruthappuzha originates as two streams from Devala and Pandalur and joins near Marutha (Randupuzhamukku). Manchakkoodu is the ending point up to which bus service is available. Some buses end their service up to Chakkappadam (buses keep the name Maruthakkadavu to attract the passengers to Marutha, continuing same name before opening the Marutha bridge). Chakkappadam is the city center in on which all villagers are dependant as a common meeting point and for available things like social services, Govt. services and others.  The main educational institute in the village is Govt. High School at School Kunnu. Postal pin code is 679333.

Nearby towns are Palemad, Vazhikkadavu, Edakkara & Nilambur.

Demographics
The population of Marutha is dominated by Muslims, Hindus (mostly Thiyya) and Christians.

Culture
Marutha village is a predominantly Muslim populated area.  Hindus exist in comparatively smaller numbers.  So the culture of the locality is based upon Muslim traditions.  Duff Muttu, Kolkali and Aravanamuttu are common folk arts of this locality.  There are many libraries attached to mosques giving a rich source of Islamic studies.  Most of the books are written in Arabi-Malayalam which is a version of the Malayalam language written in Arabic script.  People gather in mosques for the evening prayer and continue to sit there after the prayers discussing social and cultural issues.  Business and family issues are also sorted out during these evening meetings.  The Hindu minority of this area keeps their rich traditions by celebrating various festivals in their temples.  Hindu rituals are done here with a regular devotion like other parts of Kerala.

Naxalite threat
In November 2016, three naxalites were killed near Karulai in an encounter with Kerala police. Naxalite leader Kappu Devaraj from Andhra Pradesh is included in the list of killed in the incident. 
Villages like Mundakkadavu, Kalkullam and Uchakkulam near Karulai have been threatened by Naxalite attacks.  Naxalites visit the locality regularly and ask for food and shelter from the tribals.  The police are also combing the area regularly but have not arrested any naxalites. 
On 27 September 2016, there was firing between the Maoists and the Kerala police in this area and no one was injured in this incident.

Transportation
Marutha village connects to other parts of India through Nilambur town.  State Highway No.28 starts from Nilambur and connects to Ooty, Mysore and Bangalore through Highways.12,29 and 181. National highway No.66 passes through Ramanattukara and the northern stretch connects to Goa and Mumbai.  The southern stretch connects to Cochin and Trivandrum.   State.  The nearest airport is at Karipur.  The nearest major railway station is at Feroke.

Gold deposits
Marutha is highly known for its Gold deposits and the soil of Marutha contains the gold in its pure form. People used to filter the gold from the soil from late seventies to late nineties. It was the livelihood of the village men during those days. During the filtration process people used to dig huge holes in the surrounding mountains of Marutha and collect the soil which contained a high concentration of gold. Interestingly, it is a live scenario that you can see, even today – after a heavy rainfall most of the Maruthites still look downwards in search of gold nuggets in the soil which is cleared by heavy water streams.

References

Villages in Malappuram district
Nilambur area